St Paul's Tavern is a former pub at 56 Chiswell Street, London EC1. It is now a restaurant, the Chiswell Street Dining Rooms.

It is a Grade II listed building, dating back to the mid-late 18th century.

References

External links
 

Former pubs in London
Grade II listed pubs in the City of London